WIND Vision was a digital television service introduced by WIND Hellas in April 2018. It was based on a Broadband Internet Protocol television infrastructure, where digital sound and vision was carried through a telephone line to a Set-Top Box and the customer’s TV. On 25 April 2018, Wind CEO Nassos Zarkalis introduced the company's IPTV service. It was the first Android TV set-top-box in Greece with Netflix integrated. Also, it was the first service offering 4K resolution with HDR 10 technology.

The service offered more than 60 live tv channels, access to all Google services such as Google Play Movies, music apps, YouTube, the use of an electronic program guide, multiscreen and on demand (seven day catch-up and restart). It was available to all Wind fixed-line subscribers and provides two packages, family pack and full pack, which includes all Novasports channels. By the end of March 2021 it was announced that wind vision had 80,000 subscribers making it the fourth largest TV provider.

On June 1, 2022, WIND Hellas announced that its stores now have the EON TV platform for sale, essentially marking the first combined product action of the two companies, the completion of the merger under the brand of the second by the end of year is an intention for United Group, providing "holistic" telecommunications and content services (fixed and mobile telephony, internet and pay TV). After nine days (June 10) it was announced that as of December 31 of the same year, the WIND VISION service is being canceled as part of the consolidation, giving the owners of the service the possibility to replace it with the EON TV platform with exclusive preferential terms.

EON Channel list
Greek national FTA
 Vouli Tileorasi
 ERT1 HD
 ERT2 HD
 ERT3 HD
 ERT News
 ANT1 HD
 ALPHA HD
 STAR HD
 SKAI HD
 MAKEDONIA TV HD
 MEGA HD
 OPEN HD

Greek regional FTA
 Action 24
 One Channel
 Kontra Channel

Greek Subscription
 Naftemporiki

Cinema & Series
 Nova Life
 Nova Cinema (4 channels)
 Fox Life Greece
 Fox Greece
 Epic Drama

Sports channels
 Novasports News
 Novasports Start
 Novasports Prime
 Novasports 1
 Novasports 2
 Novasports 3
 Novasports 4
 Novasports 5
 Novasports 6
 Novasports Premier League
 Novasports Extra 1 HD
 Novasports Extra 2 HD
 Novasports Extra 3 HD
 Novasports Extra 4 HD
 Extreme Sports Channel
 Eurosport 1 HD
 Eurosport 2 HD
 Inplus TV HD

Documentary channels
 National Geographic
 National Geographic Wild
 Discovery HD
 Animal Planet
 Viasat Nature
 Viasat Explore
 Viasat History
 Travel Channel International
 Crime & Investigation
 History TV
 CGTN Documentary

Lifestyle
 E! HD
 TLC
 My Zen TV
 Food Network

Kids
 Disney Channel
 Disney Junior
 IDJ Kids
 Duck TV
 Smile TV
 Nickelodeon Greece
 Boomerang
 Da Vinci TV

Music
 MAD TV
 MAD Greekz
 IDJ TV
 Grand TV
 Number 1 TV
 MTV Global
 MTV Live
 MTV Hits
 MTV 00s

News
 ERT World
 RIK Sat
 CNN
 DW-TV
 France 24 (original French and English)
 Al Jazeera (original Arabic and English)
 Bloomberg TV Europe
 Euronews (Greek, English, Italian and Russian)
 CGTN
 i24NEWS (English and French)
 Arirang TV
 Freedom
 1+1

Adult
 Blue Hustler (with no extra cost for full pack subscribers)
 Hustler TV (with extra cost)
 Private TV
 Dorcel TV
 Vivid Red
 Redlight

See also
 Internet in Greece
 WIND Hellas

References

External links
 

Digital television
Television networks in Greece
Mass media companies of Greece
Companies based in Athens
Mass media companies established in 2018